Independence of Smith-dominated alternatives (ISDA, also known as Smith-IIA or Weak independence of irrelevant alternatives) is a voting system criterion defined such that its satisfaction by a voting system occurs when the selection of the winner is independent of candidates who are not within the Smith set.

A simple way to describe it is that if a voting system is ISDA, then whenever you can partition the candidates into group A and group B such that each candidate in group A is preferred over each candidate in group B, you can eliminate all candidates of group B without changing the outcome of the election.

Any election method that is independent of Smith-dominated alternatives automatically satisfies the Smith criterion (because all candidates not in the Smith set can be eliminated without changing the result, implying that the winner was someone in the Smith set), and all criteria implied by it, notably the Condorcet criterion and the mutual majority criterion.

Note that though ISDA is also called "weak independence of irrelevant alternatives", this may be misleading, since independence of irrelevant alternatives is incompatible with ISDA; this is because all majority criterion-passing methods fail IIA and ISDA implies the majority criterion. ISDA can be argued to be a natural extension of a property implied by the Condorcet criterion: Whenever candidates who are pairwise beaten by (the Condorcet winner (when one exists)/every candidate in the Smith set) are added or removed from the election, this doesn't change who wins the election. ISDA increases the IIA-compliance of Smith-efficient Condorcet methods (i.e. the pass/fail rate of the criterion), because with these methods, candidates not in the Smith set are guaranteed to lose, and therefore they are irrelevant alternatives.

Original definition 

If P is separable and neutral, then the relative standing of A and B
depends only on the ranks each voter gives A and B (i.e., not on how he assigns the
remaining candidates to the remaining ranks).

Complying methods 

Schulze and Ranked Pairs are independent of Smith-dominated alternatives.  Any voting system can be "forced" to be ISDA by applying the voting system to the Smith set only.

Methods failing the Smith criterion (let alone the Condorcet criterion) never satisfy independence of Smith-dominated alternatives.

References

Electoral system criteria